The 2020–21 Taça de Angola was the 39th edition of the Taça de Angola, the second most important and the top knock-out football club competition in Angola following the Girabola.

Petro de Luanda won the tournament by beating Interclube 2-0 in the final and secure their 12th title.

Stadia and locations

Preliminary rounds

Round of 16

Quarter-finals

Semifinals

Final

See also
 2020–21 Girabola
 2020–21 Angola Super Cup
 2020–21 CAF Confederation Cup

External links
 profile at girabola.com

References

Angola Cup
Cup
Angola